Peter or Pete Price may refer to:
Peter O. Price (born 1941), former journalist and CEO of the National Academy of Television Arts and Sciences
Peter Price (bishop) (born 1944), English bishop
Peter Price (politician) (born 1942), English politician
Peter Price (footballer, born 1932) (1932–2015), Scottish footballer (Ayr United)
Peter Price (footballer, born 1949), Welsh footballer (Peterborough United, Barnsley)
Pete Price (born 1946), English disc jockey
Peter Xavier Price (born 1985), British artist, illustrator and academic historian